Edvin Austbø (born 1 May 2005) is a Norwegian footballer who plays as a forward for Viking FK.

Career
On 19 May 2022, he made his competitive debut for Viking in a 6–1 cup win against Rosseland, scoring one of the goals. On 17 July 2022, he made his Eliteserien debut in a 2–1 win against Kristiansund.

Career statistics

References

2005 births
Living people
Sportspeople from Stavanger
Norwegian footballers
Viking FK players
Eliteserien players
Association football forwards
Norway youth international footballers